Mart Saarma (born 29 June 1949 in Tartu) is an Estonian molecular biologist, member of the Estonian Academy of Sciences.

Biography
He is the third child of the professors of the medical department of Tartu University – Jüri Saarma (psychiatrist) and Valve Erika Saarma (gastroenterologist). He has worked both in Moscow, Helsinki and Basel. His main research is dedicated to plant viruses and virus resistance, the development of the nervous system and the mechanisms of the death of nerve cells and the possibilities to use nerve growth factors in case of treating neurodegenerative diseases.

References 

1949 births
Estonian biochemists
Molecular biologists
People from Tartu
Living people
Recipients of the Order of the White Star, 2nd Class
Estonian expatriates in Finland